Hildegardia migeodii is a species of flowering plant in the family Malvaceae. The deciduous shrub or smallish tree is an uncommon to rare endemic to the coastal forests region of eastern Africa.

Range and habitat
It is occurs locally from southern Tanzania to southern Mozambique. It has been found up to 250 m, or locally to 700 m a.s.l., in forest fringes, woodland and wooded grassland.

Gallery

References

Sterculioideae
Flora of Africa